The complete discography of Big L, an American hip hop artist, consists of two studio albums, three posthumous albums, three compilation albums, one live album, four music videos, and seven singles. His first album, Lifestylez ov da Poor & Dangerous, was released in 1995. In the US, it peaked at number 149 on the Billboard 200 and number 22 on R&B/Hip-Hop Albums.

Albums

Studio albums

Posthumous albums

Compilation albums

Live albums

Singles

Promotional singles

Guest appearances

Music videos

References 

Hip hop discographies
Diggin' in the Crates Crew
Discographies of American artists